Skyfox can refer to:

Boeing Skyfox trainer aircraft
IAR-317 Skyfox, a variant of the Aérospatiale Alouette III
Skyfox Aviation Skyfox ultralight aircraft produced by Skyfox Aviation of Australia
Skyfox (1984 video game), a 1984 computer game
Sky Fox (1987 video game), an arcade game
 Skyfox is a character in Mark Millar's comic Jupiter's Legacy, as well as the TV adaptation